During the second half of 2002, the Naval Research Laboratory studied the tactical application of space assets. Relatively new technologies and processes in the areas of microsatellites, affordable and quick-response launch vehicles, and the classified SIPRNet (Secret Internet Protocol Router Network) made tactical use of space assets possible in the relatively near term. The DoD's Office of Force Transformation (OFT) agreed with the core findings of the study and decided to start an Operationally Responsive Space (ORS) Initiative consisting of a series of experiments. TacSat-1 is the first experiment in this OFT initiative. The TacSat-1 experiment received go-ahead on 7 May 2003.

The TacSat series of experimental spacecraft are designed to allow military commanders on a battlefield to request and obtain imagery and other data from a satellite as it passes overhead. Collected data will be delivered to field commanders in minutes rather than hours or days.

All TacSats have been launched on Minotaur launch vehicles.

These series of spacecraft should not be confused with the TACSAT program in 1969.

 TacSat-1 - Cancelled
 TacSat-2 - Launched 16 December 2006
 TacSat-3 - Launched 19 May 2009 
 TacSat-4 - Launched 27 September 2011
 TacSat-5 - Conceptual
 TacSat-6 - Launched on 6 December 2013

References

External links 
 http://www.responsivespace.com/ - Conference, yearly, that has content that includes Tacsat
 http://www.nrl.navy.mil/content.php?P=04REVIEW207 
 http://www.nasa.gov/mission_pages/tacsat-2/main/

Reconnaissance satellites of the United States
Air Force Research Laboratory projects
Satellite series